Henderson Calvin Howard (September 16, 1839—December 13, 1919) was a Union Army soldier who received the Medal of Honor for his actions during the Peninsular Campaign of 1862.

Biography
Howard was born in Indiana, Pennsylvania on September 16, 1839, the son of Thomas Howard and Margaret Clark McLain Howard.

Henderson joined the army in June 1861. During the Battle of Glendale in Henrico County, Virginia on June 30, 1862, he was involved in action against Confederate troops. He was captured at the Second Battle of Bull Run, but was later released.

Howard's Medal of Honor was not issued until March 30, 1898.  He was one of only two men from the 11th Pennsylvania Reserves to receive the Medal of Honor; the other was Charles Shambaugh from Company D.

He was mustered out of the army in June 1864 with the rank of First Sergeant (he had been a Corporal during the battles of the Peninsular Campaign).  After the war he served as the sheriff of Indiana County, Pennsylvania, from 1869-1872. 

Howard married Katherine Dalby on March 4, 1879 in Indiana, Pennsylvania.  They had a son, Ross Dalby Howard, who was born in 1882.

He died on December 13, 1919 in Fort Collins, Colorado, and is buried in Grandview Cemetery, Fort Collins.

Medal of Honor citation
Citation:
While pursuing one of the enemy's sharpshooters, encountered two others, whom he bayoneted in hand-to-hand encounters; was three times wounded in action.

See also

List of Medal of Honor recipients
List of American Civil War Medal of Honor recipients: G–L

Notes

11th Pennsylvania Reserves Muster Roll

External links
 
 

United States Army Medal of Honor recipients
Union Army soldiers
Pennsylvania sheriffs
1839 births
1919 deaths
People from Indiana County, Pennsylvania
People from Fort Collins, Colorado
American Civil War recipients of the Medal of Honor